The 2005–06 season was Juventus F.C.'s 108th in existence and 104th consecutive season in the top flight of Italian football before the 2006 Italian football scandal stripped the club of its previous league title, as well as this season's league title, later awarded to Internazionale, and relegated to Serie B.

Following the enforced relegation, Juventus lost Fabio Cannavaro and Emerson to Real Madrid, Lilian Thuram and Gianluca Zambrotta to Barcelona, Adrian Mutu to Fiorentina, and Patrick Vieira and Zlatan Ibrahimović to Internazionale. The rest of the squad did however stay including Alessandro Del Piero, Gianluigi Buffon, Pavel Nedvěd, David Trezeguet, Giorgio Chiellini, and Mauro Camoranesi, for the following 2006–07 Serie B. This was also their final season at the Stadio Delle Alpi.

Players

Squad information
Squad at end of season

Transfers

Winter

Out

Competitions

Supercoppa Italiana

Serie A

League table

Results summary

Results by round

Matches

Coppa Italia

Round of 16

Quarter-finals

UEFA Champions League

Group stage

Knockout phase

Round of 16

Quarter-finals

Statistics

Appearances and goals
As of 31 June 2006

Top scorers

Serie A
  David Trezeguet 23
  Alessandro Del Piero 12
  Zlatan Ibrahimović 7
  Adrian Mutu 7
  Pavel Nedvěd 4
  Patrick Vieira 4
  Fabio Cannavaro 4

References

Juventus F.C. seasons
Juventus